The World Landsailing Organisation or Fédération Internationale de Sand and Landyachting (IPSF), is an international organisation which governs national associations of land sailing worldwide. 

The federation was founded in April 2014 by representatives from Belgium, Germany, the Netherlands, France, and Great Britain. 

In October 2017, FISLY became an observer member of the Global Association of International Sports Federations.

As well as promotion and setting the rules of the sport, FISLY has also organised the World Championships since 1998 and the European Championships since 1965.

Member Associations 
Article 6 of the Constitution of FISLY gives three different types of members: 
 Full members: Full members are national landsailing federations, composed of a minimum of two clubs or federations, who are the only organisation representing landsailing in their nation. 
 Associate members: Associate members could also be the national federations for landsailing. Associate members have less voice at the FISLY council and General Assembly than full members. The right to organise interantional championships is reserved for full members. 
 Affiliate members: Associations which may assist meetings of the council of FISLY or the General Assembly, but do not have the right to vote

In 2018, the federation consisted of 16 nations:

References

External links 
 

Sports governing bodies